Ellison Griffith Smith (December 5, 1854 – September 3, 1935) was a justice of the South Dakota Supreme Court from 1909 to 1923.

Early life, education, and career
Born in Cincinnati, Ohio, to Amos G. and Mary (Ellison) Smith, the family moved to Delaware County, Iowa, during Smith's childhood, and he attended the public schools there. He received a B.A. from Lenox College in 1871, and an LL.B. from the Iowa State University in 1874, and in that year he was elected principal of the Mechanicsville high school and held that position for one year.

In 1876 he moved to Yankton, South Dakota, where he became a partner of Gideon C. Moody. Smith then took charge of the entire law business of the firm, which "was extensive and important and which included that of the office of register in bankruptcy", and Smith "gained recognition as an attorney of unusual ability". From 1878 to 1882 he served as territorial district attorney, and he was for some time the associate of the Hon. Hugh Campbell as special assistant United States Attorney. From 1886 to 1889 he was the representative of Yankton county in the territorial legislature, serving as a Republican.

Judicial service and later life
For several years he also held the position of reporter for the territorial supreme court of Dakota, and in 1889, while the incumbent in that office, was elected judge of the first judicial circuit. He was reelected thereafter, serving in that capacity for twenty years, until April 1, 1909, when Governor Robert S. Vessey appointed Smith to a newly established seat on the supreme court of South Dakota, for the fourth district. In the general election held in November, 1910, he was elected to that office for a term of six years. In 1911, he became presiding judge of the court, and was reelected in 1916, serving in that capacity until 1922, when he was defeated in his next bid for reelection by Congressman Charles Hall Dillon.

On March 1, 1923, Smith became a professor at the University of South Dakota School of Law, remaining with that institution until his death.

Personal life and death
In 1887, Smith married Anna Kirkwood of Ontario, Canada. She died in July, 1909, leaving their three children: Ellison G., Jr., who became a graduate of the Columbian University of Washington, D.C., and thereafter practiced law in Sioux City; Agnes G., who remained with her parents; and Amos Campbell, a civil engineer who became connected with the Chicago, Milwaukee & St. Paul Railroad at Aberdeen, South Dakota. In 1922, Smith married Pearl Florence Hunkins, who died in 1925. In 1927, Smith married Alberta V. Green, who survived him.

Smith died in Sioux City, Iowa, following a two-week bout of pneumonia.

References

Justices of the South Dakota Supreme Court
1854 births
1935 deaths
People from Cincinnati
Lenox College alumni
Iowa State University alumni
Members of the Dakota Territorial Legislature
South Dakota Republicans
University of South Dakota faculty